Lucas Oil Products, Inc. is an American manufacturer and distributor of automotive oil, additives, and lubricants. It was founded by trucker Forrest Lucas and his wife Charlotte in 1989. The company is a medium size manufacturer of lubricants, including engine oils, greases, gear lubes, as well as problem-solving additives and car-care products. It produces and markets approximately 270 formulations in 40 countries. In the U.S., Lucas Oil is sold in more than 30,000 auto parts stores, displaying the most variety of shelf products of any oil company, and at truck stops nationwide. Lucas Oil has its plants in the United States. The original plant in Corona, California, which also housed Lucas Oil Corporate Headquarters and several affiliated companies, was closed in late 2022, moving the corporate HQ to Indianapolis, Indiana.

In 2003, it opened a new production plant in Corydon, Indiana, and expanded with an additional, multimillion dollar, 350,000-square-foot facility in 2014.

Products and markets 
The company’s focus is to create and produce better working oils than those currently available on the commercial marketplace. The company’s first product was Heavy Duty Oil Stabilizer, followed by aftermarket products, including:
 Heavy Duty Oil Stabilizer, an ultra high viscosity petroleum multi-use oil supplement for controlling noise, heat and wear in manual transmissions and differentials
 Upper Cylinder Fuel Lubricant, marketed as delivering an extra half mile to the gallon savings for both gasoline and diesel
 Power Steering Stop-Leak, developed to address maintenance issues in rack and pinion steering mechanisms
 Lucas Transmission Fix
According to David Portalatin, an NPD industry analyst, Lucas Oil accounts for nearly all of the segment’s recent growth and is one of leading brands in the oil additives segment. The company continues to expand internationally. Current markets include Canada, Latin America, Europe, Asia, Australia, and most recently, the Middle East and Africa.

Motorsports 
Lucas Oil owns or sponsors motorsports race teams, events and series at all levels, including NASCAR, INDYCAR, NHRA, IHRA, POWRi, ASCS, WAR and MLRA. Lucas Oil also owns and operates many high profile racing series, including Lucas Oil Off Road Racing Series, Monster Jam, Lucas Oil Drag Boat Series, Lucas Oil Pro Pulling League, Lucas Oil Late Model Dirt Series, Lucas Oil Modified Series, and the Lucas Oil Speedway in Wheatland, Missouri.

MAVTV
MAVTV is a motorsports television network with a programming lineup that includes the Lucas Oil Chili Bowl, Lucas Oil Pro Motocross, the FIA World Rally Championship, NHRA Drag Racing, Lucas Oil Drag Boat Racing, Lucas Oil Off Road Racing, Lucas Oil Late Model Dirt, Lucas Oil Modified, Lucas Oil Sprint Cars and custom build shows. MAVTV is currently available on Charter, DirecTV, Google Fiber, Time Warner Cable, Verizon Fios, and hundreds of regional distributors, as well as on streaming providers FuboTV and Tikilive.

Lucas Oil Racing TV 
Launched on January 1, 2016, Lucas Oil Racing TV is a motorsports-dedicated subscription video on demand service. Programming includes both live races and a large library of both United States and international motorsports content. Many shows include expanded pre- and post-race footage, additional interviews, and background content. The service is available through the LucasOilRacing.TV website for smartphones and tablets, as well as Roku, Amazon Fire TV, Android TV, Xbox One, and Xbox 360.

Lucas Oil Production Studios 
Lucas Oil Production Studios produces more than 300 hours of television annually for CBS, CBS Sports, NBC Sports, as well as MAVTV. Lucas Oil Production Studios under the direction of Dawn Patison focus on grass roots motorsports production including the Lucas Oil Modified Series, Lucas Oil Off Road Racing Series, the Dave Despain Show, the Lucas Oil Chili Bowl Nationals, the Lucas Oil Pro Pulling League, and the Lucas Oil Late Model Series.

Team Lucas 
Team Lucas is a marketing platform for Lucas-owned motorsports properties. Partners include Carlyle Tools, GEICO, Toyota, General Tire, OPTIMA Batteries, Rockstar Energy Drink, K&N Filters, and Indianapolis Colts Lucas Oil Stadium. Team Lucas' fan and media exposure includes the many Lucas Oil sponsored series televised by MAVTV and its broadcasting partners.

Sponsorships 
The company is a sponsor of several NASCAR, H1 Unlimited, NHRA, and IndyCar events. In 2005, Lucas Oil founded the Lucas Oil Late Model Dirt Series. Since 2011, it owns the cable network MAVTV, which under its purview went from a male-focused network with a lowbrow point of view to a leading motorsports network.

On February 28, 2006, it was announced that Lucas Oil had purchased the naming rights to the Lucas Oil Stadium in Indianapolis, Indiana, for $120 million over 20 years. The facility opened in 2008 and is the home field for the NFL's Indianapolis Colts. Other events that have or will be held at the stadium include the 2010 NCAA Men's Basketball Final Four, the 2009 NCAA Men's Basketball Regional Finals, Super Bowl XLVI (February 5, 2012), the 2015 NCAA Men's Basketball Final Four, the 2016 NCAA Women's Basketball Final Four, every Big Ten Football Championship Game since the inaugural game in 2011, and every Drum Corps International World Championship since 2009.

In 2009, Lucas Oil founded the short course off-road racing series Lucas Oil Off Road Racing Series. In March 2012, Lucas Oil extended their title sponsorship of the AMA Motocross series.

Since 2011, Lucas Oil has been a main sponsor of the Professional Bull Riders (PBR) association.

At the time he purchased the mansion of Conseco co-founder Stephen Hilbert, Forrest Lucas stated, "I can justify it by having this as a corporate retreat for my employees and for my customers."

The Lucas Oil Crusader monster jam truck was debuted in Houston, Texas in 2011. It was driven by Canadian Driver, Linsey Weenk, who drove the Built Ford Tough Blue Thunder monster truck before.

Lucas Oil Rail Line 

Lucas Oil Rail Line, formerly known as the Louisville New Albany & Corydon Railroad, was added to the Corydon, Indiana's plant’s capabilities in 2006, servicing the main manufacturing facility and several other major businesses in and around the city.

Agriculture

Lucas Cattle Company 
Lucas Cattle Company was founded in 2000 in Cross Timbers, Missouri in the Ozarks. They have bred over 2,000 head of free range Simmental cattle reared on fescue, on a strict culling strategy, with an emphasis on structural soundness and other high quality traits such as longevity, fertility, and udder quality.

Protect the Harvest

Forrest Lucas is a founder of Protect the Harvest, a nonprofit organization which opposes "the radical animal rights movement” and particularly the Humane Society of the United States, which it calls "a wealthy and successful attack group". In 2012, Lucas said that he had invested over $600,000 in the organization. Its stated goals include educating the public about animal agriculture, and preventing the passing of legislative or market-initiated bans on particular production practices.

Robert Patison, general counsel for Lucas Oil Products, issued a statement on behalf of the company: "We provide significant financial support for a broad range of organizations that serve the needs of veterans, women, other minority groups, and disadvantaged individuals throughout the United States. Fairness and equality are core values of our company."

See also
 Lucas Oil Stadium
 Lucas Oil Raceway
 Lucas Oil Late Model Dirt Series
 Lucas Oil Slick Mist 200
 Lucas Oil Indiana Governor's Cup

References

External links

 

 
Motor oils
Oil companies of the United States
Petroleum in California
Companies based in Corona, California
Energy companies established in 1989
Non-renewable resource companies established in 1989
1989 establishments in California